Cahokia was a village in St. Clair County, Illinois, United States. It was located east of the Mississippi River in the Greater St. Louis metropolitan area. As of the 2010 census, 15,241 people lived in the village, a decline from 16,391 in 2000. On May 6, 2021, the village ceased to exist, being incorporated into the new city of Cahokia Heights.

The name refers to one of the clans of the historic Illini confederacy, who met early French explorers to the region. Early European settlers named the nearby (and long-abandoned) Cahokia Mounds in present-day Madison County after the Illini clan. But the UNESCO World Heritage Site and State Historic Park was developed by the Mississippian culture, active here from AD 900 to AD 1500. They created an extensive urban complex, the largest of the farflung Mississippian culture territory through the Mississippi and Ohio river valleys.

French Canadian colonists founded Cahokia village in 1696 as a Catholic mission. The historic Church of the Holy Family is the oldest continually active Catholic parish in the United States, as well as the oldest church west of the Allegheny Mountains. Other significant colonial and Federal-period buildings listed on the National Register of Historic Places include the Cahokia Courthouse (c. 1740, in the French Colonial style); and the Jarrot Mansion (c. 1810).

History
Archeologists ascribe the earthwork mounds Cahokia complex to the Mississippian culture, an earlier indigenous people who are not believed to have been ancestral to the Illini. The city site reached its peak in the 13th century and was abandoned centuries before European contact.

The Cahokia Native Americans of the Illini did not coalesce as a tribe and live in the Illinois area until nearly the time of French contact 300 years ago. Father Pinet founded a mission in late 1696 to convert the Cahokian and Tamaroa Native Americans to Christianity. Father Pinet and the Seminary of Foreign Missions of Quebec built a log church and dedicated it to the Holy Family.

During the next 100 years, Cahokia became one of the largest French colonial towns in the Illinois Country. It was centrally located for trading Indian goods and furs, and grew to about 3,000 inhabitants. Its thriving business district reflected a frontier society numerically dominated by needy males, as it had 24 brothels. The nearby town of Kaskaskia on the Mississippi River (founded 1703) became the region's leading shipping port, and Fort de Chartres (founded 1718) was developed by the French as a military and governmental command center. The  area of land between the two villages was cultivated by farming settlers, known as habitants, whose main crop was wheat. As settlement expanded, the relationship between the settlers and the Indians continued to be peaceful. Settlers were mostly Canadien migrants whose families had been in North America for a while.

Cahokia declined after the French lost the French and Indian War in North America to the British in 1763, as part of the broader Seven Years' War in Europe. Only Fort Kaskaskia (built 1733) was destroyed in the conflict, and Cahokia remained regionally important for another four decades. In the treaty ending the war, France ceded large parts of what it called the Illinois Country east of the Mississippi River to the British, including the area of Canada. Many French-speaking residents of Cahokia and elsewhere in what had been Upper Louisiana moved west of the river to territory still controlled by the French rather than live under British rule. Many moved to Lower Louisiana, where they founded new Canadien villages on the west side of the Mississippi River, such as Ste. Genevieve, Missouri and St. Louis.

The Odawa leader Pontiac was assassinated by other Indians in or near Cahokia on April 20, 1769.

In 1778, during the American Revolutionary War, Virginian George Rogers Clark captured Kaskaskia and set up a court in Cahokia, making Cahokia an independent city state even though it was part of the British Province of Quebec. Cahokia (and Kaskaskia and the rest of Illinois County) officially became part of the United States by the Treaty of Paris (1783), by which the United States took over former British territory west of the Appalachian Mountains. The US soon designated this area as the Northwest Territory (and, after Ohio and Indiana became states, the Illinois Territory). Meanwhile, 105 Cahokia "heads of household" pledged loyalty to the Continental Congress of the United States.

After Congress passed the Northwest Ordinance in 1787 and established a governmental system for the territory, the Cahokia Courthouse was adapted for use as a United States territorial courthouse. Cahokia continued as a major political center for the next 24 years. Flood-prone Kaskaskia became the governmental seat of the Illinois Territory (1809-1819), until the territorial seat was moved to Vandalia, Illinois, and in 1809 became the county seat of Randolph County. Cahokia became the seat of St. Clair County, named by and after Arthur St. Clair, the first territorial governor. When St. Clair County was enlarged in 1801 and 1809, Governor William Henry Harrison (and later territorial secretary and acting governor Nathaniel Pope) named the Cahokia Courthouse as the legal and governmental center of a sizeable area extending to the Canada–U.S. border. By 1814, other counties and territories had been organized, and St. Clair County became its current size. The county seat was moved to the more centrally located Belleville, Illinois (incorporated 1819 and as a city in 1850) when a local developer offered to donate land for a new county courthouse and seat.

In the late 1950s, Cahokia annexed some population and territory, increasing its population by more than 15,000 in 1960.

Geography

Climate

Demographics

As of the census of 2000, there were 16,391 people, 5,693 households, and 4,252 families residing in the village. The racial makeup of the village was 58.28% White, 38.69% African American, 0.32% Native American, 0.38% Asian, 0.03% Pacific Islander, 0.73% from other races, and 1.56% from two or more races. Hispanic or Latino of any race were 2.25% of the population.

There were 5,693 households, out of which 41.2% had children under the age of 18 living with them, 43.2% were married couples living together, 25.7% had a female householder with no husband present, and 25.3% were non-families. 20.9% of all households were made up of individuals, and 8.6% had someone living alone who was 65 years of age or older. The average household size was 2.84 and the average family size was 3.27.

In 2010, the population dropped to 15,241, with 61.30% being African American and 34.5% of the population being white alone.

In the village, the population was spread out, with 33.4% under the age of 18, 8.7% from 18 to 24, 29.4% from 25 to 44, 16.9% from 45 to 64, and 11.6% who were 65 years of age or older. The median age was 31 years. For every 100 females, there were 88.7 males. For every 100 females age 18 and over, there were 82.5 males.

The median income for a household in the village was $31,001, and the median income for a family was $35,582. Males had a median income of $31,806 versus $22,429 for females. The per capita income for the village was $14,545. About 22.8% of families and 24.9% of the population were below the poverty line, including 37.0% of those under age 18 and 5.3% of those age 65 or over.

Transportation
Cahokia is home to the St. Louis Downtown Airport, a general aviation facility.

Metro operates the #2 bus route to East St. Louis, Illinois where connections can be made to the MetroLink light rail to St. Louis.

Education
Cahokia Unit School District 187 operates public schools.

Notable people
Well Hungarians – country and rock band
Terron Armstead - NFL player

See also

Battle of St. Louis (1780)

References

Further reading
 Reed, Denita. Cahokia (Images of America). Arcadia Publishing, 1998. , 9780738589978.

External links 
 Village of Cahokia

Villages in Illinois
Villages in St. Clair County, Illinois
Populated places established in the 1690s
Illinois populated places on the Mississippi River
French colonial settlements of Upper Louisiana
1699 establishments in the French colonial empire
Former municipalities in Illinois
Former populated places in Illinois
Populated places disestablished in 2021